

Champions

Major League Baseball
World Series: Los Angeles Dodgers beat New York Yankees (4–0); Sandy Koufax, MVP
All-Star Game, July 9 at Municipal Stadium: National League, 5–3; Willie Mays, MVP

Other champions
College World Series: USC
Japan Series: Yomiuri Giants over Nishitetsu Lions (4–3)
Little League World Series: Granada Hills National, Granada Hills, California
Senior League World Series: Monterrey, Mexico
Pan American Games: Cuba over United States

Awards and honors
Baseball Hall of Fame
John Clarkson
Elmer Flick
Sam Rice
Eppa Rixey
Most Valuable Player
Elston Howard, New York Yankees, C (AL)
Sandy Koufax, Los Angeles Dodgers, P (NL)
Cy Young Award
Sandy Koufax, Los Angeles Dodgers
Rookie of the Year
Gary Peters, Chicago White Sox, P (AL)
Pete Rose, Cincinnati Reds, 2B (NL)
Gold Glove Award
Vic Power (1B) (AL) 
Bobby Richardson (2B) (AL) 
Brooks Robinson (3B) (AL) 
Zoilo Versalles (SS) (AL) 
Jim Landis (OF) (AL) 
Al Kaline (OF) (AL) 
Carl Yastrzemski (OF) (AL)
Elston Howard (C) (AL) 
Jim Kaat (P) (AL)

MLB statistical leaders

1Major League Triple Crown Pitching Winner

Major league baseball final standings

American League final standings

National League final standings

Events

January
January 27 – Sam Rice, Eppa Rixey, Elmer Flick and John Clarkson are elected to the Baseball Hall of Fame by the Special Veterans Committee.

February

March
March 22 –  The New York Mets, who finished last in the National League with a 40–120 record in their inaugural season, purchase pitcher Carl Willey from the Milwaukee Braves. Willey will boost a pitching rotation that includes Roger Craig, Al Jackson and Tracy Stallard. The Mets will improve to 51–111 in 1963.

April
April 11 – Warren Spahn of the Milwaukee Braves becomes the all-time winningest left-handed pitcher in Major League Baseball history. His 6–1 victory over the New York Mets gives him 328 career wins, moving him ahead of Eddie Plank as the all-time winningest left-hander. Except for Duke Snider's home run in today's game, no Mets get past second base.
April 13 — After 11 hitless at bats, Cincinnati Reds second baseman Pete Rose records his first major league hit, a triple off Pittsburgh Pirates pitcher Bob Friend. Increased enforcement of the balk rule produces a Major League record seven in the Pirates' 12–4 trouncing of the Reds at Crosley Field. Friend commits four of the balks.

May
May 5 – The Detroit Tigers released Vic Wertz. Wertz would later sign with the Minnesota Twins to finish out his 17-year career.
May 9 – Chicago Cubs first baseman Ernie Banks became the first National League player to record 22 putouts in a game, during a 3–1 victory over the Pittsburgh Pirates.
May 11 – At Dodger Stadium, Sandy Koufax of the Los Angeles Dodgers no-hits the San Francisco Giants 8–0, his second no-hitter in as many seasons. The final out is made by Harvey Kuenn on a ground ball back to than Koufax. Kuenn will also make the final out of Koufax's perfect game two years later.
May 17 – Houston Colt .45's pitcher Don Nottebart throws the first no-hitter in franchise history, leading his team past the Philadelphia Phillies, 4–1.
May 19 – Detroit Tigers center fielder Bill Bruton tied a Major League record for most doubles in a single game. Brutton hit his four doubles in a row, as Detroit defeated the Washington Senators, 5–1. Teammate and rookie pitcher Bill Faul tossed a three-hitter in his first Major League start.
May 23 – The New York Mets trade Gil Hodges to the Washington Senators for Jimmy Piersall. Hodges returned to the Mets as their manager in 1968.

June
June 2 – At Busch Stadium, Willie Mays hits three home runs off pitchers Ernie Broglio, Bob Humphreys and Bobby Shantz, helping the San Francisco Giants beat the St. Louis Cardinals 6–4.
June 9 – Ernie Banks hits three home runs as the Chicago Cubs lose to the Los Angeles Dodgers 11–8.
June 10 – Al Kaline hit his 200th career home run helping the Detroit Tigers beat the Boston Red Sox 6–1.
June 11 – Bob Aspromonte clouts a walk-off grand slam in the tenth inning off pitcher Lindy McDaniel to give the Houston Colt .45s a 6–2 victory over the Chicago Cubs at Colt Stadium.
June 14 – The New York Mets' Duke Snider hits his 400th career home run off Bob Purkey in the first inning of the Mets' 10–3 victory over the Cincinnati Reds at Crosley Field.
 Willie Kirkland of the Cleveland Indians hits a home run in the 11th inning to tie the game 2–2. In the 19th inning, he hits the game-winning home run to defeat the Washington Senators. Kirkland joins Vern Stephens as the only player to hit two extra-inning home runs.
June 15 – At Candlestick Park, Juan Marichal of the San Francisco Giants no-hits the Houston Colt .45's, 1–0, becoming the first Latin American pitcher to throw a no-hitter. The no-hitter is the first by a Giant since the franchise's move from New York City after the 1957 season. Moreover, Marichal joined Carl Hubbell, who did it while pitching for the New York York Giants in 1929, as the second Giants pitcher to accomplish the feat.

July
July 1 – The Kansas City Athletics purchased the contract of Charley Lau from the Baltimore Orioles.
July 2 – The Giants' Juan Marichal pitched a 16-inning shutout against the Milwaukee Braves, outdueling Warren Spahn, who pitched  scoreless innings before Willie Mays won it 1–0 with a home run in the bottom of the 16th. In the 9th inning when the Giants' manager suggested Marichal should come out for a pinch hitter, he angrily replied “I am not going to come out of that game as long as that old man is still pitching.” Later, when the Braves manager suggested to Spahn that it was time for him to come out he was told that if that young kid could still pitch, then so could he. When it was over, Marichal had thrown 227 pitches and Spahn had thrown 201.
July 9 – At Municipal Stadium, the National League wins 5–3 over the American League in the All-Star Game. After four years, MLB had decided to return to the original single-game format. The American League out-hit the National League 11–6, but the effort went in vain as MVP Willie Mays put on a one-man show. Although he was held to a single, Mays collected two runs, two RBI, two stolen bases and made the defensive play of the game – a running catch that deprived Joe Pepitone of an extra base hit in the eighth inning. This game also marked the 24th and final All-Star appearance of Stan Musial, who pinch-hit in the fifth inning. He lined out to right field, leaving behind a .317 batting average (20-for-63) and an All-Star Game record of six home runs.
July 31 – A crowd of 7,288 at Cleveland Stadium watched Cleveland Indians infielder Woodie Held, pitcher Pedro Ramos, outfielder Tito Francona, and shortstop Larry Brown slug four straight solo home runs off Los Angeles Angels right-hander Paul Foytack in the bottom of the sixth inning. The four homers built the Indians' lead to 9–1, and they won, 9–5.

August
August 7 – The New York Mets beat the St. Louis Cardinals, 7–3. Mets outfielder Jim Hickman hits for the cycle, doing it in order. Both are firsts for the Mets.
August 9 – Jim Hickman of the New York Mets becomes the second player to hit a walk-off grand slam against Chicago Cubs pitcher Lindy McDaniel this season, in a 7–3 victory at Polo Grounds. Bob Aspromonte of the Houston Colt .45s did that on June 11.
August 27 – Willie Mays hits his 400th career home run helping the San Francisco Giants beat the St. Louis Cardinals 7–2.
August 23 – Milwaukee Braves veteran pitcher Warren Spahn topped the National League record for most starts in a season, previously set by Grover Alexander, with his 601st appearance on the mound during a 6–1 win over the Los Angeles Dodgers. Later in the season, Spahn would match a National League record set by Christy Mathewson with his 13th, 20-win season, while becoming the oldest pitcher to do so at age forty-two.
August 29 – Helped by a league-record-tying eight home runs, the Minnesota Twins garner a team-record forty-seven total bases in the first game of a double-header at D.C. Stadium. Harmon Killebrew and Vic Power both strike for two homers in the 14–2 victory.  In the second game, a 10–1 Minnesota win, the Twins hit four more homers for a team-record even dozen on the day.

September
September 5 – Willie McCovey hits his 100th career home run.
September 6 – Major League Baseball celebrated its 100,000th game with a classic match-up between the Cleveland Indians and the Washington Senators at D.C. Stadium.
September 10 – The Alous become the first brother trio to bat consecutively in one game, during the eighth inning of a San Francisco Giants' 4–2 loss to the New York Mets at the Polo Grounds. Jesús pinch-hits in his Major League debut and grounds out to shortstop Al Moran; Matty, also pinch-hitting, strikes out, and Felipe ends the inning by grounding out to pitcher Carl Willey, who goes the distance for the victory.
September 13:
Cleveland Indians pitcher Early Wynn finally won his 300th and final game thanks to a little help from the Indian's bullpen. After losing eight straight starts and struggling through five innings against the Kansas City Athletics, Wynn was replaced by relief man Jerry Walker, who tossed four scoreless innings en route to a 7–4 win over the Athletics.
The New York Yankees beat the Minnesota Twins 2-0 to clinch their 28th American League pennant.
September 18 – In the final regular-season game ever played at the Polo Grounds, the Philadelphia Phillies defeat the New York Mets 6–1. New York gets its only run on Jim Hickman's 4th-inning home run, the last home run to be hit at the park.
September 21 – Harmon Killebrew, in a double-header split between his Minnesota Twins and the Boston Red Sox at Fenway Park, hits four home runs on the day to tie an American League record.
September 22:
Willie McCovey hits 3 home runs helping San Francisco Giants beat the New York Mets 13–4.
Outfielder Jimmie Hall of the Minnesota Twins hits his 33rd and final home run of the year. No other rookie without previous-year at bats has hit more.  Hall tops the current record-holder, Boston's Ted Williams, who hit 31 in 1939.
September 27 – Manager Harry Craft of the Houston Colt 45s fields the "Baby Colts", a starting lineup with an average age of nineteen years, against the New York Mets at Colt Stadium. The oldest player used by Houston all game was 26-year-old Dick Drott, who pitched the ninth inning.
September 28 – Minnesota Twins first baseman Vic Power hits his tenth home run of the year. It is the club's 225th, a season total that ranks second behind the 1961 New York Yankees' 240.
September 29:
Stan Musial hits an RBI single off Cincinnati Reds pitcher Jim Maloney in the final at-bat of his 22-year major league career spent entirely with the St. Louis Cardinals as the Cardinals go on to defeat the Reds 3-2.
John Paciorek makes his MLB debut for the Houston Colt .45s at the age of 18. In the game Paciorek hits three hits, drives in four runs, and draws two walks. Since he reached base in all five plate appearances, he has a batting average of 1.000. However, this would be Paciorek's only appearance in a major league game. He'd suffer an injury in the minors that would end his baseball career by the time he was 24.

October
October 6 – At Dodger Stadium, Sandy Koufax defeats the New York Yankees, 2–1, completing a shocking World Series sweep for the Los Angeles Dodgers. Whitey Ford gives up only two hits, both by Frank Howard, who belts a long home run in the fifth inning to start the Dodgers' scoring. In the Series, the Yankees bat just .171 and score only four runs, the second-lowest total in World Series history. Curiously enough, the Dodgers would set the mark for the least runs scored in a World Series only three years later, falling victim to a decisive sweep at the hands of the Baltimore Orioles.
October 12 – In the first (and last) Hispanic American major league All-Star Game, the National League team beats the American League 5–2 at the Polo Grounds. The game features such names as Felipe Alou, Luis Aparicio, Orlando Cepeda, Roberto Clemente, Julián Javier, Minnie Miñoso, Tony Oliva and Zoilo Versalles. Vic Power receives a pregame award as the number one Latin player. NL starter Juan Marichal strikes out six in four innings, though reliever Al McBean is the winning pitcher. Pinch hitter Manny Mota drives in two runs against loser Pedro Ramos. This was the last baseball game played at the Polo Grounds, as the New York Mets would move into the brand new Shea Stadium in 1964.
October 29 – The New York Yankees release catcher Yogi Berra so he could manage the team for the 1964 season.

November
November 26 – Second baseman Pete Rose is a landslide winner of National League Rookie of the Year honors, taking 17 of 20 first place votes, with the others going to Ron Hunt (2) and Ray Culp (1). Rose becomes the second Cincinnati Reds player to win the award, joining Frank Robinson.
November 27:
Chicago White Sox pitcher Gary Peters, who posted a 19–8 record with 189 strikeouts and a 2.33 ERA, edges teammate third baseman Pete Ward (.295 BA, 22 HR, 84 RBI) and Minnesota Twins outfielder Jimmie Hall (.260, 33, 80) for American League Rookie of the Year honors. Peters takes 10 of 20 first-place votes, Ward six and Hall four.
In a first baseman transaction, the Kansas City Athletics acquire Jim Gentile and $25,000 from the Baltimore Orioles in exchange for Norm Siebern.

December
December 2:
The MLB Rules Committee bans oversized catcher's mitts, effective in 1965.
The Indianapolis and Little Rock franchises are transferred from the International League to the Pacific Coast League. With  the movement, the IL is reduced to eight clubs while the PCL membership is raised to 12 clubs.

Births

January
January 2 – David Cone
January 2 – Edgar Martínez
January 4 – Daryl Boston
January 4 – Trey Hillman
January 5 – John Davis
January 5 – Jeff Fassero
January 6 – Norm Charlton
January 6 – Bob Davidson
January 7 – Craig Shipley
January 8 – Shane Turner
January 15 – William Brennan
January 18 – Bill Sampen
January 19 – Scott Little
January 20 – Cecil Espy
January 22 – Javier Ortiz
January 22 – Jeff Treadway
January 23 – Marty Brown
January 26 – Kevin Blankenship
January 26 – José Segura
January 28 – Gary Mielke
January 29 – Brian Meyer
January 31 – Dave Cochrane
January 31 – Francisco Oliveras

February
February 7 – Brian O'Nora
February 10 – Lenny Dykstra
February 10 – Dane Johnson
February 11 – Todd Benzinger
February 14 – John Marzano
February 15 – Barry Jones
February 18 – LaVel Freeman
February 18 – Jeff McKnight
February 20 – Phil Lombardi
February 21 – Jim Olander
February 22 – Don Wakamatsu
February 23 – Bobby Bonilla
February 24 – Matías Carrillo
February 25 – Larry Arndt
February 25 – Joel McKeon
February 25 – Paul O'Neill

March
March 1 – Tony Castillo
March 1 – Rich Rodriguez
March 7 – Keith Miller
March 9 – Terry Mulholland
March 10 – John Cangelosi
March 13 – Mariano Duncan
March 14 – Mike Rochford
March 16 – Fieldin Culbreth 
March 19 – Chuck Jackson
March 20 – Rick Parker
March 20 – Dana Williams
March 21 – Shawon Dunston
March 22 – Rich Monteleone
March 26 – Luis Medina
March 27 – Mike Dalton
March 27 – Drew Hall
March 29 – Laz Díaz

April
April 3 – Chris Bosio
April 9 – Mike Brumley
April 9 – José Guzmán
April 10 – Mike Devereaux
April 10 – Marvin Freeman
April 10 – Jeff Gray
April 13 – Mark Leiter
April 18 – Alex Madrid
April 18 – Pete Stanicek
April 21 – Ken Caminiti
April 24 – Tony DeFrancesco
April 26 – Lou Thornton

May
May 3 – Joe Kmak
May 5 – Kimiyasu Kudo
May 14 – Shawn Barton
May 14 – Pat Borders
May 17 – Tom Newell
May 20 – David Wells
May 21 – José Román
May 27 – Scott Jordan
May 27 – Edwin Núñez

June
June 2 – Bryan Harvey
June 8 – Scott Ruskin
June 12 – Keith Miller
June 17 – Tom Drees
June 17 – Matt Kinzer
June 18 – Russ McGinnis
June 21 – Jeff Musselman
June 25 – Mike Stanley
June 27 – Nelson Simmons

July
July 3 – Don August
July 4 – José Oquendo
July 6 – Todd Burns
July 6 – Lance Johnson
July 7 – Paul Nauert
July 9 – Mark Higgins
July 14 – John Dopson
July 17 – Bobby Thigpen
July 18 – Mike Greenwell
July 19 – Mark Carreon
July 19 – Vicente Palacios
July 22 – Gary Eave
July 22 – Denny Gonzalez
July 23 – Pat Pacillo
July 29 – Steve Frey
July 29 – Tommy Gregg
July 30 – Jeff Shaver
July 31 – Scott Bankhead

August
August 8 – Brett Gideon
August 8 – Ron Karkovice
August 9 – Vance Lovelace
August 10 – Jerald Clark
August 11 – Mike Huff
August 11 – Van Snider
August 12 – Kent Anderson
August 13 – Jeff Ballard
August 13 – Dennis Powell
August 14 – Mike Cook
August 15 – Eric Fox
August 17 – Jeff Fischer
August 20 – Brad Arnsberg
August 20 – José Cecena
August 20 – Kal Daniels
August 20 – Israel Sánchez
August 21 – Ken Jackson
August 22 – Darrin Jackson
August 29 – Jeff Richardson

September
September 3 – Ced Landrum
September 3 – Eric Plunk
September 5 – Jeff Brantley
September 6 – John Pawlowski
September 10 – Randy Johnson
September 10 – Terry Wells
September 12 – Keith Hughes
September 12 – Mike Roesler
September 13 – Rodney McCray
September 21 – Troy Afenir
September 21 – Cecil Fielder
September 22 – Jeff Peterek
September 23 – Terry McGriff
September 25 – Eric Hetzel
September 26 – Calvin Jones
September 28 – Hawa Koroma

October
October 1 – Mark McGwire
October 4 – Bruce Ruffin
October 7 – Ty Van Burkleo
October 9 – Félix Fermín
October 13 – Bryan Hickerson
October 17 – Ravelo Manzanillo
October 18 – Jeff Wetherby
October 20 – Luis Encarnación
October 22 – Bill Fulton
October 24 – Mark Grant
October 27 – Eric Bell
October 27 – Bip Roberts
October 31 – Fred McGriff
October 31 – Matt Nokes
October 31 – Mike Smith

November
November 2 – Sam Horn
November 2 – Pat Rice
November 3 – Mike Christopher
November 8 – Dwight Smith
November 10 – Andrés Thomas
November 11 – Rey Quiñones
November 15 – Yasuaki Taiho
November 18 – Dante Bichette
November 23 – Rich Sauveur
November 23 – Dale Sveum
November 25 – Marty Foster
November 28 – Walt Weiss

December
December 1 – Greg W. Harris
December 3 – Damon Berryhill
December 4 – Bernardo Brito
December 5 – Sam Khalifa
December 6 – Lance Blankenship
December 7 – Jim Austin
December 7 – Billy Bates
December 7 – Steve Howard
December 7 – Shane Mack
December 9 – Tom Magrann
December 10 – Doug Henry
December 10 – Luis Polonia
December 10 – Gil Reyes
December 10 – Rick Wrona
December 16 – Chris Jelic
December 18 – Jim Czajkowski
December 27 – Jim Leyritz
December 28 – Mel Stottlemyre Jr.

Deaths

January
January 4 – Sam Covington, 68, first baseman who played in 40 games over three seasons for the 1913 St. Louis Browns and 1917–1918 Boston Braves.
January 5 – Rogers Hornsby, 66, Hall of Fame second baseman (1915–1937), mainly for the St. Louis Cardinals, who posted the highest lifetime batting average (.358) of any right-handed batter, also a seven-time batting champion including a .424 mark in 1924, twice MVP, and the first National League player to hit 300 home runs; as player-manager, led 1926 Cardinals to the franchise's first World Series title; also played for New York Giants, Boston Braves, Chicago Cubs and St. Louis Browns and managed Braves, Cubs, Browns and Cincinnati Reds.
January 7 – Harl Maggert, 79, outfielder who appeared in 77 total games for the 1907 Pittsburgh Pirates and 1912 Philadelphia Athletics; his son played for the 1938 Brooklyn Dodgers.
January 29 – Win Ballou, 65, pitcher in 99 games over four seasons between 1925 and 1929 for Washington Senators, St. Louis Browns and Brooklyn Robins.
January 29 – Lee Meadows, 68, pitcher won 188 games for the Cardinals, Phillies and Pirates, as well as the first modern major leaguer to wear glasses.
January 31 – Ossie Vitt, 73, third baseman for the 1912–1918 Detroit Tigers and 1919–1921 Boston Red Sox; longtime minor-league manager known for piloting 1937 Newark Bears, one of the strongest clubs in history of minors; managed 1938–1940 Cleveland Indians to a 262–198–2 (.570) record, but his tenure was marred by a player revolt.

February
February 9 – Ray Starr, 56, All-Star pitcher who pitched for six teams—most prominently the 1941–1943 Cincinnati Reds—and won 37 career games.
February 10 – Bunny Brief, 70, outfielder/first baseman who batted only .223 in 184 MLB games for the 1912–1913 St. Louis Browns, 1915 Chicago White Sox and 1917 Pittsburgh Pirates, but a feared minor-league slugger who led the American Association in homers five teams between 1920 and 1926 and amassed seasons of 191, 151, 164, and 175 runs batted in over the same span.
February 15 – Bump Hadley, 58, pitcher who worked in 528 games over 16 years (1926–1941) for six MLB teams (going 161–165, 4.24); ended Mickey Cochrane's career with a 1937 pitch that fractured his skull; later a broadcaster in Boston.
February 15 – Harlin Pool, 54, outfielder who appeared in 127 games for the 1934–1935 Cincinnati Reds.
February 20 – Bill Hinchman, 79, outfielder twice batted .300 for Pittsburgh, later a scout.
February 28 – Eppa Rixey, 71, pitcher elected to the Hall of Fame just one month earlier; winningest left-hander in NL history (until 1959) with 266 victories for Philadelphia Phillies (1912–1917 and 1919–1920) and Cincinnati Reds (1921–1933); won 20 games four times and lost 20 games twice.
February 28 – Charlie Spearman, 71, catcher/first baseman for the 1923–1926 Brooklyn Royal Giants and 1928–1929 New York Lincoln Giants of the Eastern Colored League and American Negro League.

March
March 1 – Irish Meusel, 69, left fielder for four MLB teams over 11 seasons between 1914 and 1927, principally the Philadelphia Phillies and New York Giants; member of 1921 and 1922 world champion Giants; batted .310 lifetime and led NL in RBI in 1923; older brother of Bob Meusel.
March 11 – Joe Judge, 68, first baseman who batted over .300 nine times for Senators, later coach at Georgetown for 20 years.
March 11 – Robert "Farmer" Ray, 76, pitcher who appeared in 21 games for 1910 St. Louis Browns.
March 27 – Fritz Knothe, 59, third baseman and shortstop who played in 174 games for the Boston Braves and Philadelphia Phillies in 1932–1933.
March 29 – Wilcy Moore, 65, New York Yankees' ace relief pitcher who in 1927 saved 13 games and won 19 (he made 12 starts among his 50 appearances), and AL earned run average title (2.28); in addition, he won clinching Game 4 of 1927 World Series and was a member of Yanks' 1928 and 1932 world champs; also pitched briefly for Boston Red Sox in his six-season (1927–1929 and 1931–1933) and 261-game career.

April
April 7 – Jim Ball, 79, catcher who appeared in 16 games for the 1907–1908 Boston Doves of the National League. 
April 14 – Earl Kunz, 64, pitcher who worked in 21 games for the 1923 Pittsburgh Pirates.
April 23 – Harry Harper, 67, pitched from 1913 through 1923 for the Washington Senators, Boston Red Sox, New York Yankees and Brooklyn Robins.
April 25 – Hal Elliott, 63, Philadelphia Phillies pitcher who worked in 120 games from 1929–1933; posted a dreadful 6.95 career ERA in 322 innings pitched, playing his home games at the Phils' bandbox stadium, Baker Bowl.
April 27 – Johnny Hutchings, 47, pitcher for the Cincinnati Reds and Boston Braves who worked in 155 games over six seasons between 1940 and 1946.

May
May 4 – Dickie Kerr, 69, pitcher who as a 1919 rookie won two World Series games for the Chicago White Sox, as one of the players not involved in fixing the Series; later helped a struggling pitcher-turned-hitter, Stan Musial.
May 4 – Pat McNulty, 64, outfielder who played in 308 games for the Cleveland Indians (1922, 1924–1927).
May 4 – Ray Pierce, 65, left-handed pitcher who worked in 66 career games for the Chicago Cubs and Philadelphia Phillies from 1924 to 1926.
May 16 – Larry Woodall, 68, backup catcher who played 548 games for 1920–1929 Detroit Tigers; later, a longtime employee of Boston Red Sox as coach (1942–1948), director of public relations, and scout—when he famously took a pass on signing a teenaged Willie Mays.
May 22 – Dave Shean, 79, second baseman and captain of the World Series champion 1918 Red Sox.
May 23 – Gavvy Cravath, 82, right fielder and "dead-ball era" slugger, who won six home runs titles with Phillies between 1913 and 1919; managed Phils from July 8, 1919 through 1920 season.
May 24 – Hi West, 78, pitcher in 19 games over two stints (in 1905 and 1911) with Cleveland Naps.
May 27 – Dave Jolly, 38, knuckleball relief pitcher for the Milwaukee Braves from 1953 to 1957.
May 30 – Joe McDonald, 75, third baseman in ten games for the 1910 St. Louis Browns.
May 31 – Ernie Sulik, 52, outfielder for the 1936 Philadelphia Phillies.
May – Connie Rector, 70, Negro leagues pitcher between 1920 and 1944; went 18–1 for the New York Lincoln Giants in 1929.

June
June 1 – Henry Gillespie, 66, Negro leagues pitcher between 1921 and 1932.
June 6 – Charlie Mullen, 74, first baseman for the Chicago White Sox and New York Yankees in the 1910s.
June 8 – Earl Smith, 66, good-hitting catcher who batted .303 over 860 career games for 1919–1923 New York Giants, 1923–1924 Boston Braves, 1924–1928 Pittsburgh Pirates and 1928–1930 St. Louis Cardinals; played for five National League champions (1921, 1922, 1925, 1927, 1928, 1930), and three World Series champs (1921, 1922, 1925); batted .350 for Pittsburgh in 1925 World Series.
June 18 – Ben Geraghty, 50, infielder who played in 70 total games for the 1936 Brooklyn Dodgers and 1943–1944 Boston Braves; legendary minor league manager who played a key role in the early career of Henry Aaron; at his death, incumbent skipper of the Jacksonville Suns of the International League.
June 24 – George Trautman, 73, president of the minor leagues since 1947; previously president of the American Association (1933–1945) and general manager of Detroit Tigers (1946).
June 24 – Jud Wilson, 69, Hall of Fame and All-Star third baseman of the Negro leagues who batted .352 lifetime in 900 games between 1923 and 1945, and three times (1927, 1929, 1941) eclipsed the .400 mark.
June 28 – Frank "Home Run" Baker, 77, Hall of Fame third baseman, a lifetime .307 hitter and four-time home run champion, as well as the last surviving member of Philadelphia Athletics' "$100,000 infield".

July
July 1 – Earl Moseley, 75, pitcher who starred in the "outlaw" Federal League, winning 19 games for Indianapolis in 1914 and ERA championship (1.91) for Newark in 1915; also pitched for 1913 Boston Red Sox and 1916 Cincinnati Reds.
July 2 – Pat Flanagan, 70, radio voice of the Chicago Cubs from 1929 to 1943 on WBBM, calling games for three National League champions and handling play-by-play for the first MLB All-Star Game in 1933; also described White Sox games.
July 5 – Ben Demott, 74, pitcher for the Cleveland Naps from 1910 to 1911.
July 12 – "Happy Jack" Cameron, 78, Canadian outfielder/pitcher who appeared in 18 games for Boston of the National League in 1906.
July 14 – Bill Lindsay, 82, third baseman in 19 games for the 1911 Cleveland Naps.
July 19 – Charlie Hanford, 81, native of the United Kingdom who appeared in 232 games as an outfielder for Buffalo and Chicago of the Federal League in 1914 and 1915,
July 24 – Luther Roy, 60, pitcher who appeared in 56 career contests for the Cleveland Indians (1924–1925), Chicago Cubs (1927), Philadelphia Phillies (1929) and Brooklyn Robins (1929).
July 25 – Rags Roberts, 67, outfielder/catcher for 1923 Baltimore Black Sox of the Eastern Colored League.
July 27 – Hooks Dauss, 73, pitcher won 222 games, all for Detroit, for whom he played from 1912 through 1926.

August
August 2 – Pete Standridge, 71, pitcher who appeared in 31 total games for 1911 St. Louis Cardinals and 1915 Chicago Cubs. 
August 4 – Bob Fisher, 76, shortstop and second baseman who played 503 games in the National League for Brooklyn, Chicago, Cincinnati and St. Louis over seven seasons spanning 1912 to 1919.
August 5 – Herb Crompton, 51, catcher who played 38 career games in the majors as a member of the 1937 Washington Senators and 1945 New York Yankees.
August 6 – Frank Ray, 54, outfielder in 26 games for 1932 Montgomery Grey Sox of the Negro Southern League.
August 15 – Karl Drews, 43, pitcher who worked in 418 games for four MLB teams between 1946 and 1954, including 1947 champion New York Yankees.
August 24 – Ren Kelly, 63, pitched one game for the Philadelphia A's in 1923.

September
September 4 – Home Run Johnson, 88, early shortstop of the Negro leagues.
September 8 – Bill Knickerbocker, 51, infielder for five different teams from 1933 to 1942, and a member of 1938 and 1939 Yankees champion teams as a backup infielder.
September 11 – Ham Hyatt, 78, reserve outfielder/first baseman who appeared in 465 career games for the Pittsburgh Pirates (1909–1910, 1912–1914), St. Louis Cardinals (1915) and New York Yankees (1922).
September 16 – Johnny Niggeling, 60, one of four knuckleballers in starting rotation of 1945 Washington Senators; also pitched for Boston Bees/Braves, Cincinnati Reds and St. Louis Browns between 1938 and 1946.
September 19 – Slim Harriss, 66, pitcher who went 95–135 (4.25) for mostly struggling Philadelphia Athletics and Boston Red Sox teams from 1920 to 1928.
September 24 – Daff Gammons, 87, who appeared in 28 games—primarily as an outfielder—in 1901 for Boston of the National League.
September 27 – Andy Coakley, 80, pitcher won 18 games for 1905 Athletics, later coach at Columbia for 37 years.

October
October 2 – Cy Perkins, 67, catcher for 17 seasons in the American League, mostly with the Philadelphia Athletics (1917–1930); also a coach for New York Yankees, Detroit Tigers and Philadelphia Phillies for 15 seasons between 1932 and 1954.
October 18 – Frank Emmer, 67, Cincinnati Reds shortstop who played in 122 career games over two seasons spaced over a decade (1916, 1926).
October 25 – Jim Lindsey, 64, pitcher who hurled 177 career games, mostly in relief, for the Cleveland Indians (1922 and 1924), St. Louis Cardinals (1929–1934), Cincinnati Reds (1934) and Brooklyn Dodgers (1937); member of 1931 world champion Redbirds.
October 26 – Newt Hunter, 83, first baseman in 65 games for 1911 Pittsburgh Pirates; coach for 1920 Cardinals and 1928–1930 and 1933 Phillies.

November
November 6 – Clarence Mitchell, 72, spitball pitcher who won 125 games over 18 seasons between 1911 and 1932 — most notably for the Philadelphia Phillies and Brooklyn Robins — for six MLB clubs; hit into unassisted triple play in 1920 World Series.
November 12 – Ed Connolly, 54, catcher for the Boston Red Sox between 1929 and 1932; his son pitched for 1964 Red Sox.
November 13 – Muddy Ruel, 67, catcher for 19 seasons for six American League teams, including 1924 World Series champion Washington Senators (when he scored the Series-deciding run); held law degree from Washington University in St. Louis; later a longtime coach, manager of 1947 St. Louis Browns, general manager of 1954–1956 Detroit Tigers, and assistant to the Commissioner of Baseball.
November 14 – Oscar "Ski" Melillo, 64, second baseman in 1,377 games for St. Louis Browns (1926–1935) and Boston Red Sox (1935–1937); interim manager of 1938 Browns; later a longtime coach associated with manager Lou Boudreau.
November 17 – Lewis Means, 64, catcher who played in the Negro leagues between 1920 and 1928.
November 20 – Marty Hopkins, 56, second-string third baseman who played in 136 career games for 1934 Philadelphia Phillies and 1934–1935 Chicago White Sox.
November 21 – Ed Hock, 64, outfielder/pinch runner for 1920 St. Louis Cardinals and 1923–1924 Cincinnati Reds, getting into 19 MLB games.
November 22 – John F. Kennedy, 46, President of the United States who threw out the ceremonial first pitch of the 1961 MLB season and became only the 2nd president to attend an All-Star Game in 1962.
November 25 – Rube Parnham, 69, pitcher for 1916–1917 Philadelphia Athletics who worked in six career games; compiled a 2–1 won–lost mark in four contests for the abysmal 1916 Athletics to become the sole pitcher with a winning record for a team that lost 117 of 153 games.

December
December 8 – Red Worthington, 57, left fielder for Boston Braves from 1931 to 1934.
December 10 – Carl Fischer, 55, left-handed hurler who appeared in 191 games for five American League teams (principally the Washington Senators and Detroit Tigers) between 1930 and 1937.
December 12 – Myles Thomas, 66, pitcher for 1926–1929 New York Yankees and 1930 Senators who worked in 105 MLB games; member of World Series champions in 1927 and 1928 but did not appear in either Fall Classic.
December 20 – Dinny McNamara, 58, outfielder/pinch runner who played in 20 games for the 1927–1928 Boston Braves.
December 21 – Happy Townsend, 84, pitcher who went 34–82 (with a 3.59 ERA) in 153 games for three clubs between 1901 and 1906, notably posting a 22–69 mark for execrable Washington Senators teams from 1902 to 1905.
December 21 – Harry Williams, 73, first baseman who played 86 total games for 1913–1914 New York Yankees.
December 28 – Ray Keating, 70, pitcher who appeared in 130 career games for the New York Highlanders/Yankees (1912–1916, 1918) and Boston Braves (1919).
December 30 – Wilbur Good, 78, outfielder for six teams, primarily the Cubs.
December 31 – Junie Barnes, 52, left-hander who pitched to only two batters in his two MLB games, on September 12 and 21, 1934, as a member of the Cincinnati Reds.

References